Kanika Tiwari (born 9 March 1996) is an Indian actress from Madhya Pradesh. She debuted into Bollywood with Agneepath (2012). She has acted as female lead in Telugu film Boy Meets Girl (2014), Kannada film Rangan Style (2014), and Tamil film Aavi Kumar (2015). She is cousin of TV actress Divyanka Tripathi.

Filmography

See also
 Zoya Afroz

References

External links
 
 

Living people
Actresses from Bhopal
1996 births
Actresses in Hindi cinema
21st-century Indian actresses
Female models from Madhya Pradesh